Wolfgang Prentice (born April 25, 2000) is an American soccer player who currently plays for Northern Colorado Hailstorm in USL League One, on loan from Oakland Roots of the USL Championship.

Career

Youth
Prentice attended high school at both Redondo Union High School and Rancho Del Mar High School, where he graduated. Prentice also played club soccer for various state teams such as LA Galaxy, Pateadores, and Real So Cal.

College
In 2018, Prentice attended California State University, Northridge to play college soccer. He played two seasons with the Matadors, making 35 appearances, scoring four goals and tallying five assists. In his junior season he was named to the Big West Conference All-Freshman team.

In 2019, Prentice was part of the FC Golden State Force teams in the USL League Two and NPSL, but didn't make a first team appearance in either league.

Professional
In 2020, Prentice had trials with both Orange County SC and New York Cosmos. However, didn't sign with either club.

Prentice signed his first professional contract with NISA side San Diego 1904   in 2021, going on to make 16 league appearances and scoring a single goal.

Prentice joined USL Championship club Oakland Roots on March 11, 2022. He debuted for the club on April 3, 2022, appearing as a 76th–minute substitute during a 2–0 loss to Greenville Triumph in the US Open Cup.

Prentice joined Northern Colorado Hailstorm in USL League One on a loan for the remainder of the 2022 season.

References

External links
CSUN bio

2000 births
Living people
American soccer players
Association football forwards
Cal State Northridge Matadors men's soccer players
FC Golden State Force players
National Independent Soccer Association players
Oakland Roots SC players
Northern Colorado Hailstorm FC players
Soccer players from California
Sportspeople from Redondo Beach, California
USL Championship players
USL League One players